The Willamette River Greenway is a cooperative state and local government effort to maintain and enhance the scenic, recreational, historic, natural and agricultural qualities of the Willamette River and its adjacent lands. A number of trails exist along the greenway, but significant gaps still exist.

Oregon State Treasurer Robert Straub proposed in 1966 public ownership of lands along the Willamette, during his run for Governor of Oregon.  Tom McCall won the election and adopted the proposal. The Greenway was established by the 1967 Oregon legislature and U.S. Senator Maurine Neuberger sought federal funds to support the program.

The 1973 Oregon legislature passed the Willamette River Greenway Act, which established ties to a comprehensive state land use law (Oregon Senate Bill 100) passed that same year.

In 1975, the Oregon Department of Land Conservation and Development included the Willamette River Greenway as one of nineteen standards for statewide planning, requiring that public access, native vegetation, and scenic views be considered when planning new developments.

See also 
 Land use in Oregon
 Tom McCall Waterfront Park: portion of the greenway in downtown Portland
 Vera Katz Eastbank Esplanade:  more greenway near downtown Portland
 40-Mile Loop:  Willamette Greenway is one portion of extensive pathways throughout Portland
 Oregon Beach Bill: public access to ocean beaches was presumed early in Oregon's history, but asserted by law in 1966

References 

Parks in Oregon
Land use in Oregon
Willamette River
1967 establishments in Oregon